Bheiglys Mujica (born 11 August 1989) is a Venezuelan softball player. She competed in the women's tournament at the 2008 Summer Olympics.

References

External links
 

1989 births
Living people
Venezuelan softball players
Olympic softball players of Venezuela
Softball players at the 2008 Summer Olympics
Sportspeople from Valencia, Venezuela